The following highways are numbered 446:

Japan
 Japan National Route 446

United States
  Indiana State Road 446
  Kentucky Route 446
  Maryland Route 446
  Nevada State Route 446
  New Jersey Route 446 (unsigned designation for the Atlantic City Expressway)
  New Jersey Route 446X (unsigned designation for the Atlantic City–Brigantine Connector)
  New Mexico State Road 446
  New York State Route 446
  Ohio State Route 446
  Pennsylvania Route 446
  Puerto Rico Highway 446